This Gift may refer to:

 This Gift (album), a 2008 album by Sons and Daughters, or the title song
 This Gift, a 1997 album by Gary Chapman, 
 "This Gift" (song), a 1999 song by 98 Degrees
 "This Gift", song by Hardline from II, 2002
 "This Gift", song by Hassan Hakmoun from The Gift, 2002
 "This Gift", song by Mudhoney from Mudhoney, 1989

See also
 Gift (disambiguation)